Chesterfield is a town in Chesterfield County, South Carolina, United States. The population was 1,472 at the 2010 census. It is the county seat of Chesterfield County.  At the time of the 2010 census, Chesterfield was the least populous of all of South Carolina's county seats.

History
The East Main Street Historic District, Dr. Thomas E. Lucas House, and West Main Street Historic District are listed on the National Register of Historic Places, supervised by the National Park Service of the U.S. Department of the Interior.

Geography
Chesterfield is located in northeastern Chesterfield County at  (34.733626, -80.088945).

South Carolina Highway 9 passes through the town, leading east  to Cheraw and west  to Pageland. South Carolina Highway 145 crosses SC 9 near the center of town, leading southwest  to McBee and northeast  to Morven, North Carolina. South Carolina Highway 102 leads south from Chesterfield  to Patrick.

Demographics

2020 census

As of the 2020 United States census, there were 1,357 people, 571 households, and 406 families residing in the town.

2000 census
As of the census of 2000, there were 1472 people, 597 households, and 358 families residing in the town. The population density was 383.2 people per square mile (147.9/km2). There were 683 housing units at an average density of 198.6 per square mile (76.7/km2). The racial makeup of the town was 64.64% White, 34.67% African American, 0.15% Native American, 0.09% Asian, 0.29% from other races, and 0.15% from two or more races. Hispanic or Latino of any race were 0.83% of the population.

There were 597 households, out of which 28.1% had children under the age of 18 living with them, 38.5% were married couples living together, 19.8% had a female householder with no husband present, and 39.9% were non-families. 37.2% of all households were made up of individuals, and 17.8% had someone living alone who was 65 years of age or older. The average household size was 2.19 and the average family size was 2.86.

In the town, the population was spread out, with 23.2% under the age of 18, 7.7% from 18 to 24, 25.7% from 25 to 44, 24.9% from 45 to 64, and 18.5% who were 65 years of age or older. The median age was 41 years. For every 100 females, there were 81.5 males. For every 100 females age 18 and over, there were 73.0 males.

The median income for a household in the town was $25,833, and the median income for a family was $36,806. Males had a median income of $31,488 versus $20,625 for females. The per capita income for the town was $16,481. About 19.7% of families and 23.7% of the population were below the poverty line, including 39.0% of those under age 18 and 22.2% of those age 65 or over.

Education
Chesterfield has a public library, a branch of the Chesterfield County Library System.

Geology
The "great syenite dyke" extends from Hanging Rock through Taxahaw to the Brewer and Edgeworth mine in Chesterfield.

See also
 National Register of Historic Places listings in Chesterfield County, South Carolina

References

External links
Town of Chesterfield official website

 
Towns in Chesterfield County, South Carolina
Towns in South Carolina
County seats in South Carolina